A joint address is a special procedure of the Canadian Parliament, in which members of the House of Commons and Senate sit jointly in the former chamber, the latter acting, for the occasion, as an auditorium. The speaker of the House of Commons takes his chair, as normal, with the speaker of the Senate seated to their right. Members of Parliament also take their usual seats, with senators and justices of the Supreme Court positioned on the floor of the House, in front of the clerk's table. Gallery privileges are suspended during a joint address and access to those areas is strictly limited to invited guests.

Circumstances
Such an event is used most commonly when a visiting dignitary—such as a foreign head of state or head of government—is asked to address Parliament. However, on more rare occasions, the process may also be used to make a formal, binding request of the Canadian monarch; for example, this was part of the process used to amend the constitution of Canada prior to patriation in 1982. In extreme circumstances, a joint address may also be used to remove a person previously appointed by the King-in-Council—such as a judge or ambassador—if other avenues of doing so have failed. For example, Prime Minister Lester B. Pearson announced a joint address in 1967 to have Leo Landreville removed from the bench of the Supreme Court of Ontario, due to allegations of improper stock trading. Landreville had previously refused to resign, as he had not actually been convicted of a crime, but, resigned voluntarily after the government declared its intention to forcibly remove him from office.

Although most addresses are made to joint sessions of Parliament, on 7 May 1941, Robert G. Menzies, Prime Minister of Australia, spoke only to the House of Commons. On 25 August 1943, Franklin D. Roosevelt, President of the United States, addressed senators, members of Parliament, and the general public outside the houses of Parliament.

Dignitaries
The following persons have addressed a joint session of Parliament:

Winston Churchill
During the Second World War, Winston Churchill, Prime Minister of the United Kingdom, stopped in Ottawa after meetings with the United States government in Washington, D.C. Churchill spoke to a joint meeting of Canada’s parliamentarians in the House of Commons on 30 December 1941, delivering an "electrifying address that stirs the passions and strengthens the resolve of a nation at war." In responding to a French general's claim that, "England will have her neck wrung like a chicken" in three weeks time from a German invasion, Churchill declared, "some chicken! Some neck!" The response was met by a roar of laughter and thunderous applause. Churchill would go on to lead the Allied effort to victory in the Second World War.

Richard Nixon
President of the United States Richard Nixon arrived in Ottawa on a state visit on 13 April 1972. He met with Governor General Roland Michener and Prime Minister Pierre Trudeau before addressing a joint meeting of the Parliament of Canada. Nixon, invoking his Nixon Doctrine on foreign policy, struck a blunt tone in his remarks. "Canadians and Americans [must] move beyond the sentimental rhetoric of the past. It is time for us to recognize that we have very separate identities [...] Each nation must determine the path of its own progress." Bruce Muirhead wrote that, after the state visit, "Nixon returned to Washington with a reinforced dislike of Ottawa, Trudeau, and most things Canadian. He told his Chief of Staff, H.R. Haldeman, that he had put it to these people for kicking the US around after what we did for that lousy son of a bitch [Trudeau]. Wasting three days up there. That trip we needed like a hole in the head."

Ronald Reagan
After meeting with Prime Minister Pierre Trudeau, American President Ronald Reagan addressed the Canadian Parliament on 11 March 1981, speaking humbly about the strong Canada-US relationship. "America counts many friends across the globe, surely we have no better friend than Canada." Reagan even demonstrated his ability to use both of Canada’s official languages when he spoke several phrases in French. The President concluded his remarks by offering an olive branch to the people of Canada: "We're happy to be your neighbour. We want to remain your friend. We're determined to be your partner and we're intent on working closely with you in a spirit of cooperation." Reagan addressed the Canadian Parliament once more as President, in 1987.

Margaret Thatcher
Margaret Thatcher. then-Prime Minister of the United Kingdom, addressed Parliament on 26 September 1983. Only one year after the patriation of the Canadian constitution, Thatcher recognized that, "a constitutional link has, quite properly, been severed," but Canada and the United Kingdom are still linked in important ways, including the belief "in the same high and honourable ideals", like freedom, justice, and parliamentary democracy. In 2013, after a 30-year ban on classified Cabinet files had expired, documents from the British National Archives revealed that, prior to her trip to Ottawa, Thatcher had been briefed to be careful of Prime Minister Pierre Trudeau's "unsound personal views" and of Canadians "inordinately sensitive" nature. Thatcher, by then the Lady Thatcher, returned to Canada in 1988 and, at the invitation of Prime Minister Brian Mulroney, addressed Parliament again.

Nelson Mandela
Mere months after being released from 27 years prison, South Africa's Nelson Mandela became only the fourth person who was not a head of state or head of government to address a joint session of the Parliament of Canada. Mandela thanked Prime Minister Brian Mulroney and the government of Canada for its strong opposition to the apartheid regime in South Africa and pleaded to keep the sanctions in place to pressure the South African government towards reform. In 1998, Mandela returned to address the Canadian Parliament as the first democratically elected President of South Africa.

Aga Khan
Prime Minister Stephen Harper invited the Aga Khan to address Canada’s Parliament in February 2014. The spiritual leader and 49th hereditary iman of the Shia Imami Ismaili Muslims spoke of the "unprecedented honour" to speak in the House of Commons and called Canada an "exemplary leader" in the "global effort to foster peace, prosperity, and equality through pluralism." The Aga Khan was bestowed honorary Canadian citizenship and, fresh after the 2014 Winter Olympics, joked that he hoped be asked to join the Canadian Olympic hockey team.

Barack Obama
Immediately following the 2016 Three Amigos Summit in Ottawa, Prime Minister Justin Trudeau invited United States President Barack Obama to address the Parliament of Canada on 29 June 2016. Obama delivered a portrait of the "extraordinary alliance and deep friendship between Canadians and Americans." Nearing the end of his term in office, and fresh off the Brexit vote in the United Kingdom, Obama spoke in defence of the international liberal order in the face of rising isolationist sentiment around the world. Obama offered an endorsement of Trudeau when he said that, "my time in office may be nearing an end, but I know that Canada—and the world—will benefit from your [Trudeau’s] leadership [sic] for years to come." The President also quoted the Prime Minister's late father, Pierre Trudeau: "A country is not something you build as the pharaohs built the pyramids [...] A country is something that is built every day out of certain basic shared values." This was Obama’s second state visit to Canada, but the first time addressing a joint session of Parliament.

See also
 Speech from the Throne
 Joint session of the United States Congress
 United States presidential visits to Canada
 List of people who have addressed both Houses of the United Kingdom Parliament

References

External links
 Heads of States and of Governments who have addressed Joint Sessions of the Senate and House of Commons of Canada

Parliament of Canada
Foreign relations of Canada
Canada
Canadian traditions
Speeches by type